This is intended to be a comprehensive list of HSMM or "hinternet" nodes worldwide.
The minimum criteria for a system being a node on this list is as follows:
 Operate at a speed of greater than 56kbit/s
 Accommodate IPv4, IPv6 or both
 Accept connections and/or be used as a digipeater
 Operational within an authorized Amateur radio or MARS band
 Continuously powered on and accepting connections or digipeating, excluding power outages and maintenance downtime

802.11

United States

Kansas

Texas

D-Star

United States

Alabama

Florida

See also

802.11
AX.25
D-Star
HSMM
Packet radio

Packet radio
Radio-related lists